The 11th Pan American Games were held in Havana, Cuba from August 2 to August 18, 1991.

Medals

Gold

Men's 100 metres: Robson da Silva
Men's 200 metres: Robson da Silva
Men's 1500 metres: José Valente
Men's 3000 m Steeplechase: Adauto Domingues
Men's 400 m Hurdles: Eronilde de Araújo
Men's Decathlon: Pedro da Silva

Silver

Men's Marathon: José Santana
Men's Triple Jump: Anísio Silva

Bronze

Men's 20 km Road Walk: Marcelo Palma
Women's 3000 metres: Carmem de Oliveira

Results by event

See also
Brazil at the 1992 Summer Olympics

References
 Official website of the Brazilian Olympic Committee

External links 

 Havana 1991 - XI Pan American Games - Official Report at PanamSports.org

Nations at the 1991 Pan American Games
Pan American Games
1991